William Thompson (18 May 1905 – 3 April 1994) was a Canadian cross-country skier. He competed in the men's 18 kilometre event at the 1928 Winter Olympics.

References

1905 births
1994 deaths
Canadian male cross-country skiers
Canadian male Nordic combined skiers
Olympic cross-country skiers of Canada
Olympic Nordic combined skiers of Canada
Cross-country skiers at the 1928 Winter Olympics
Nordic combined skiers at the 1928 Winter Olympics
People from Leeds and Grenville United Counties
Sportspeople from Ontario